Selo pri Ihanu is a settlement south of Ihan in the Municipality of Domžale in the Upper Carniola region of Slovenia.

Name
The name of the settlement was changed from Selo to Selo pri Ihanu (literally, 'Selo near Ihan') in 1953. The name Selo is derived from the Slovene common noun selo 'village, settlement'. In the past the German name was Sela.

References

External links

Selo pri Ihanu on Geopedia

Populated places in the Municipality of Domžale